Charles Curtis (1860–1936) was the 31st vice president of the United States.

Charles Curtis may also refer to:
Charles Curtis (botanist) (1853–1928), English plant-collector
Charles Curtis (musician), avant-garde American musician
Charles Curtis (storekeeper) (1850–1923), New Zealand storekeeper and local politician
Charles B. Curtis (born 1940), former chairman of the Federal Energy Regulatory Commission
Charles Berwick Curtis (1795–1876), manufacturer of gunpowder
Charles David Curtis (born 1939), British geologist
Charles Gordon Curtis (1860–1953), American engineer, turbine inventor, winner of the Rumford Prize
Charles W. Curtis (born 1926), mathematician
Chuck Curtis (1935–2016), American football coach

See also
Curtis (disambiguation) 
Charles Curtiss (1908–1993), American communist
Charles Dwight Curtiss (1887–1983), United States' Federal Highway Administration administrator